Live Ruination is the second EP by Job for a Cowboy. It was released on November 23, 2010, by Metal Blade Records as a digital EP on iTunes. It contains the band's live performance from a live music video shoot on June 6, 2009, at the First Unitarian Church in Philadelphia. Despite the album's title, only two songs from Ruination are on it, not including "The Matter of Splatter," which is a cover of Exhumed and a bonus track on certain versions of Ruination.

Track listing

Personnel 
Jonny Davy – lead vocals
Bobby Thompson – guitar
Al Glassman – guitar
Brent Riggs – bass guitar, backing vocals
Jon Rice – drums, percussion

References 

2010 EPs
Job for a Cowboy albums
Metal Blade Records EPs
Albums with cover art by Pär Olofsson